The Diocese of Boga-Zaire is an Anglican See in the Province of the Anglican Church of the Congo: the first bishop was Philip Ridsdale. 

Other bishops include
 Patrice Njojo Byankya

Notes

Anglicanism in the Democratic Republic of the Congo
Anglican bishops of Boga-Zaire